Richard Henry Horn (March 18, 1930 – October 22, 2022) was a professional American football quarterback in the National Football League. He played one season with the Baltimore Colts in 1958. He died on October 22, 2022.

Horn played safety and was the backup quarterback for Stanford. He completed Stanford Medical School in 1959.

References

External links
 Pro-Football reference

1930 births
Living people
American football quarterbacks
Baltimore Colts players
Stanford Cardinal football players
Stanford University School of Medicine alumni
Players of American football from Santa Monica, California